Just Another Day is the first album by the British rock group Wire Daisies. It was produced by John Cornfield, the owner of Sawmills Studios who has previously worked with Razorlight, Athlete and Supergrass.

Track listing

External links

2004 albums
Wire Daisies albums